During the 2019–20 season, Heracles Almelo participated in the Eredivisie and the KNVB Cup. Due to the COVID-19 pandemic, the Eredivisie season was abandoned with Heracles Almelo in 8th place. They were knocked out in the round of 16 in the KNVB Cup, losing at home to SBV Vitesse.

Competitions

Eredivisie

League table

KNVB Cup

Player Transfers

Players In

Players Out

References

Heracles Almelo
Heracles Almelo seasons